Ralf Isau (born 2 March 1956, in Berlin) is a German author of fantasy novels, often archaeology-themed. He received the 1997 Buxtehuder Bulle for his novels Das Museum der gestohlenen Erinnerungen and Das Netz der Schattenspiele.

Isau formerly worked as an IT consultant. He lives in Stuttgart, is married and has a daughter.

Works 
 Der Drache Gertrud. 1994, 
 Das Museum der gestohlenen Erinnerungen. 1997, 
 Das Echo der Flüsterer. 1998, 
 Das Netz der Schattenspiele. 1999, 
 Pala und die seltsame Verflüchtigung der Worte. 2002, 
 Der Silberne Sinn. 2003, 
 Die unsichtbare Pyramide. 2003, 
 Die geheime Bibliothek des Thaddäus Tillmann Trutz. 2003, 
 Der Leuchtturm in der Wüste. 2004, 
 Der Herr der Unruhe. 2004, 
 Die Galerie der Lügen. 2005, 
 Die Dunklen. 2007, 
 Minik – An den Quellen der Nacht. 2008, 
 Der Mann, der nichts vergessen konnte. 2008, 
 Metropoly. 2008, 
 Der Tränenpalast. 2008, 
 Der Schattendieb. 2009,

Neschan-Trilogie 
 Die Träume des Jonathan Jabbok. 1995, 
 Das Geheimnis des siebten Richters. 1996, 
 Das Lied der Befreiung Neschans. 1996,

Der Kreis der Dämmerung 
 Der Kreis der Dämmerung – Teil 1. 1999, 
 Der Kreis der Dämmerung – Teil 2. 2000, 
 Der Kreis der Dämmerung – Teil 3. 2001, 
 Der Kreis der Dämmerung – Teil 4. 2001,

Die Chroniken von Mirad 
 Das gespiegelte Herz. 2005, 
 Der König im König. 2006, 
 Das Wasser von Silmao. 2006,

External links 
Ralf Isau

20th-century German novelists
21st-century German novelists
German fantasy writers
1956 births
Living people
Writers from Stuttgart
German male novelists
20th-century German male writers
21st-century German male writers